The red-bellied gracile opossum (Cryptonanus ignitus) is an extinct species of opossum that was native to Jujuy Province in northwest Argentina. Its forest habitat has been destroyed, and it was last seen in 1962.

References

Opossums
Endemic fauna of Argentina
Marsupials of Argentina
Extinct marsupials
Extinct mammals of South America
Mammal extinctions since 1500
Mammals described in 2002